The College of Biblical Studies–Houston is a private nonprofit nondenominational evangelical coed Bible college located in Houston, Texas. The school was founded as the Houston Bible & Vocational Institute in 1976. In 2008, the college had 1,399 students. In 2019, the college had 460 students with 134 of them being full-time. In 2007, 51% of students were African-American and 23% were Hispanic. In 2019, 47% of the students were black, 24% Hispanic, 17% white, and 8% Asian.

History

The College of Biblical Studies–Houston (CBS), formerly Houston Bible Institute (HBI), was started by the late Rev. Ernest L. Mays, with a particular focus on inner-city minority groups. The Houston Bible & Vocational Institute was incorporated in 1976, but a decision was made to focus on biblical and theological training, since adequate resources for vocational training were believed to exist in the area.

In the fall of 1979, Houston Bible Institute offered its first classes, using the facilities of KHCB-FM (a Christian radio station in Houston) for its classrooms, and leasing administrative space nearby. Rev. Rodney L. Cooper was the school's first executive director.

In 1983, Rev. Cooper resigned to study a Ph.D., and Rev. Jack Arrington, formerly Vice President, became president. In 1991, Rev. Arrington left the college and Dr. William Boyd was hired to replace him. Under Boyd's leadership, the college grew through a scholarship program, the Texas Higher Education Coordinating Board certified the school as a college (in 1996), the name was changed from "Houston Bible Institute" to "College of Biblical Studies–Houston," and a collaboration was established with Dallas Theological Seminary.

In 1994, a campus located near Hillcroft and the Southwest Freeway was purchased, and in 1999, the college became nationally accredited through the Accrediting Association of Bible Colleges (now the Association for Biblical Higher Education).

In July 2007, Dr. Jay A. Quine became president,  with Boyd becoming Chancellor. In January 2013, the College of Biblical Studies-Houston became accredited with the Southern Association of Colleges and Schools Commission on Colleges to award up to Baccalaureate degrees. In July 2012, Dr. William Blocker became president.

Courses
The college offers degree programs online and on campus which include Associate of Biblical Studies taught in English and Spanish, and Bachelor of Science degree programs with majors in Biblical Studies, Biblical Counseling, Organizational Leadership, Christian Leadership, and Women's Ministry. Programs also include a Bible Certificate in English or Spanish and non-credit classes through the Center for Continuing Studies.

Theological position
The college is nondenominational and evangelical, and more specifically dispensational, premillennial, and non-charismatic. Its "doctrinal statement" includes the premillennial belief that the "imminent return of the Lord [...] is to be followed in order by: the tribulation; the establishment of the reign of Christ on earth for one thousand years; the eternal state of punishment for the unsaved and the eternal state of blessing for the saved."

Accreditation
CBS is accredited by the Association for Biblical Higher Education. and is also accredited by the Southern Association of Colleges and Schools Commission on Colleges to award up to baccalaureate degrees.

References

External links

Association for Biblical Higher Education
Universities and colleges in Houston
Educational institutions established in 1979
Bible colleges